Meconema is the type genus of European bush crickets in the subfamily Meconematinae, tribe Meconematini and subtribe Meconematina.

Species
The Orthoptera Species File includes:
 Meconema meridionale Costa, 1860 - southern oak bush-cricket
 Meconema thalassinum (De Geer, 1773) - oak bush-cricket - type species (as Locusta varia Fabricius)

The Japanese species Meconema subpunctatum has been reassigned to the genus Xiphidiopsis (X. subpunctata (Motschulsky, 1866))

References

External links

Meconematinae
Tettigoniidae genera
Orthoptera of Europe